In Haryana the courses of Law are offered by various private and government colleges and universities around fifty Legal Education Centres. These courses are being taught in various universities and colleges in India. One can pursue his or her study in various law courses such as LL.B, integrated LL.B, LL.M and doctoral courses. LLB is an undergraduate degree that covers core specializations and mainly focuses on Criminal Law, Contract Law, Constitutional/Administrative Law, Equity and Trusts, land Law, Tort Law. The alphabetical list of CLE's are as under:-

See also
 Autonomous law schools in India
 Common Law Admission Test
 Legal education in India

References

India
 
Schools
Lists of universities and colleges in India
Haryana-related lists